Glenn Buhr (born December 18, 1954) is a Canadian composer, pianist and conductor, who has been active in both classical music and jazz music.

Early life and education 
Originally from Winnipeg, Manitoba, Buhr studied music at the University of Manitoba, the University of British Columbia and the University of Michigan. Buhr grew up in a Mennonite family originating in Gretna, Manitoba.

Career 
Buhr has served as both a composer and conductor for symphonies and ballets, has composed film scores, and has recorded two jazz albums with his own Glenn Buhr Quartet.

He has been a four-time Juno Award nominee for Best Classical Composition, receiving nods at the Juno Awards of 1991 for "Aviravirmayedhi", at the Juno Awards of 1996 for "Piano Concerto", and dual nods at the Juno Awards of 2000 for "String Quartet No. 1" and "Winter Poems".

He is married to writer Margaret Sweatman; Buhr and Sweatman won the Genie Award for Best Original Song at the 26th Genie Awards in 2006 for "When Wintertime", a song they cowrote for the film Seven Times Lucky.

References

External links

1954 births
Living people
20th-century Canadian composers
20th-century Canadian pianists
21st-century Canadian composers
21st-century Canadian pianists
Canadian classical composers
Canadian film score composers
Canadian jazz composers
Canadian classical pianists
Canadian jazz pianists
Canadian male composers
Canadian male pianists
Canadian Mennonites
Mennonite musicians
Best Original Song Genie and Canadian Screen Award winners
Musicians from Winnipeg
University of Manitoba alumni
University of British Columbia alumni
University of Michigan alumni
Academic staff of Wilfrid Laurier University